Gerry Mulligan Meets Stan Getz (also released as Getz Meets Mulligan in Hi-Fi) is an album by American jazz saxophonists Gerry Mulligan and Stan Getz featuring performances recorded in 1957 released on the Verve label.

Reception

The Allmusic site awarded the album 3 stars.

Track listing
 "Let's Fall in Love" (Harold Arlen, Ted Koehler) – 6:25
 "Anything Goes" (Cole Porter) – 3:35
 "Too Close for Comfort" (Jerry Bock, Larry Holofcener, George David Weiss) – 6:54
 "That Old Feeling" (Sammy Fain, Lew Brown) – 5:55
 "This Can't Be Love" (Richard Rodgers, Lorenz Hart) – 8:44
 "A Ballad" (Gerry Mulligan) – 5:41
 "Scrapple from the Apple" (Charlie Parker) – 8:05 Bonus track on CD reissue
 "I Didn't Know What Time It Was" (Rogers, Hart) – 8:59 Bonus track on CD reissue
Tracks 7 and 8 originally appeared on an LP with Oscar Peterson trio tracks comprising Side B (MGV-8348)

Personnel
Gerry Mulligan - baritone saxophone (tracks 4-8), tenor saxophone (tracks 1-3)
Stan Getz - tenor saxophone (tracks 4-8), baritone saxophone (tracks 1-3)
Lou Levy - piano
Ray Brown - bass
Stan Levey - drums

References 

Stan Getz albums
Gerry Mulligan albums
1957 albums
Albums produced by Norman Granz
Verve Records albums